Hans Lion (11 May 1904 – September 1969) was an Austrian Olympic fencer. He competed at the 1928 and 1936 Summer Olympics.

References

1904 births
1969 deaths
Austrian male fencers
Olympic fencers of Austria
Fencers at the 1928 Summer Olympics
Fencers at the 1936 Summer Olympics